Sir Oswald Mosley, 6th Baronet, of Ancoats (1896–1980) was a British baronet, politician, and fascist activist.

Oswald Mosley may also refer to:
 Sir Oswald Mosley, 1st Baronet, of Rolleston (1674–1751) 
 Sir Oswald Mosley, 2nd Baronet, of Rolleston  (1705–1757)
 Sir Oswald Mosley, 2nd Baronet, of Ancoats (1785–1871), British baronet and politician
 Sir Oswald Mosley, 4th Baronet, of Ancoats (1848–1915), British baronet and landowner
 Sir Oswald Mosley, 5th Baronet, of Ancoats (1873–1928)

See also 
Mosley Baronets